Blatets refers to the following places:

 Blatets, Kyustendil Province, village in Bulgaria
 Blatets, Sliven Province, village in Bulgaria
 Blatec, Vinica, village in the Republic of Macedonia